Vladimir Sergeevich Kiriyenko (born 27 May 1983) is a Russian business executive and media manager who is the CEO of VK, a popular Russian social networking service. He previously served as vice president of Rostelecom, one of Russia's leading long-distance telephone providers. Kiriyenko is the son of Kremlin official Sergey Kiriyenko.

Early life and education 
Kiriyenko was born 27 May 1983, in Nizhny Novgorod. He is the son of Sergey Kiriyenko. Kiriyenko graduated from the Higher School of Economics in 2005. He completed an executive Master of Business Administration from the Moscow School of Management SKOLKOVO in 2014.

Career 
From 2005 to 2011, he was the chairman of the board of directors of the VolgaTelecom and a member and chairman of the board of directors of Sarovbusinessbank. From 2008 to 2011, Kiriyenko was head of the board of directors of Nizhegorodpromstroybank. In 2011, he became chairman of Capital LLC, and in 2013 led venture capital (VC) firm Titanium Investments.

In 2016, Kiriyenkov succeeded  Larisa Tkachuk as the vice president of Rostelecom. VKontakte shares have dropped since the new ownership structure and announcement of Vladimir Kiriyenko’s appointment. The stock price dropped 5% in trading in Moscow with losses of 30% — or $1.4 billion lost in market value. In February 2022, Kiriyenko was sanctioned by the United States Department of the Treasury and added to the Specially Designated Nationals and Blocked Persons List. On 8 March 2022, Kiriyenko was sanctioned by the European Union.

Personal life 
Kiriyenko is married and has a son.

References

1983 births
Living people
Businesspeople from Nizhny Novgorod
Rostelecom
Higher School of Economics alumni
Moscow School of Management SKOLKOVO alumni
Russian individuals subject to the U.S. Department of the Treasury sanctions
Russian individuals subject to European Union sanctions
Specially Designated Nationals and Blocked Persons List
21st-century Russian businesspeople
Russian people of Jewish descent
Russian people of Ukrainian descent